Luís Fábio Gomes (born 11 November 1975) is Brazilian football player.

Career
He played for Slovak sides Slovan Bratislava, Spartak Trnava and Artmedia Petržalka.

Gomes has made 90 Czech Gambrinus liga appearances, scoring 14 goals, for Drnovice, Marila Příbram and Tescoma Zlín.

References

External links

1975 births
Living people
Brazilian footballers
Brasiliense Futebol Clube players
ŠK Slovan Bratislava players
FC Spartak Trnava players
FC Petržalka players
Czech First League players
FK Drnovice players
1. FK Příbram players
FC Fastav Zlín players
Slovak Super Liga players
Shamakhi FK players
Azerbaijan Premier League players
Brazilian expatriate footballers
Expatriate footballers in Slovakia
Expatriate footballers in the Czech Republic
Expatriate footballers in Azerbaijan
Brazilian expatriate sportspeople in Slovakia
Brazilian expatriate sportspeople in the Czech Republic
Brazilian expatriate sportspeople in Azerbaijan
Footballers from São Paulo
Association football forwards